Gymnothorax microspila is a moray eel found in the eastern Indian Ocean, around the East Indian Archipelago. It was first named by Albert Günther in 1870.

References

microspila
Fish described in 1870
Taxa named by Albert Günther